The 1907 New Jersey gubernatorial election was held on November 5, 1907. Republican nominee John Franklin Fort defeated Democratic nominee Frank S. Katzenbach with 49.28% of the vote.

Republican nomination

Candidates
J. Franklin Fort, Associate Justice of the New Jersey Supreme Court
Vivian M. Lewis, New Jersey Clerk in Chancery
Mahlon Pitney, Associate Justice of the New Jersey Supreme Court
Frank H. Sommer, Essex County Sheriff

Results
The Republican State Convention was held in Trenton on September 10.

Democratic nomination

Candidates
John Hinchcliffe, former Mayor of Paterson and State Senator
Frank S. Katzenbach, Mayor of Trenton
James E. Martine, former member of the Plainfield Common Council and candidate for U.S. Representative in 1906

Results
The Democratic State Convention was held in Trenton on September 17.

General election

Candidates
John C. Butterworth (Socialist Labor)
John Franklin Fort, Associate Justice of the New Jersey Supreme Court (Republican)
Frank S. Katzenbach, Mayor of Trenton (Democratic)
Frederick Krafft, activist and business manager of the New Yorker Volkszeitung (Socialist)
James G. Mason (Prohibition)

Results

Notes

References

1907
1907 New Jersey elections
New Jersey
November 1907 events